Tim Brennan  is an American musician who is a lead guitarist, vocalist and one of the primary songwriters of the Boston Celtic punk group Dropkick Murphys.

Early life and career 
Born in West Hartford, Connecticut, Brennan played drums for numerous punk, hardcore and rock bands in Connecticut where he graduated from Kingswood-Oxford preparatory high school in West Hartford CT in 2000 before moving to Worcester MA to attend Assumption College. While in High School Tim had a teacher who gave him a Pogues cassette tape. Tim learned how to play the tin whistle while listening to that tape. Later the same teacher gave Tim the Dropkick Murphys album "Do or Die" thus fully introducing Tim to Celtic Punk Music. In 2003, Brennan was asked to join the Dropkick Murphys on tour to sell merchandise on the Warped Tour. While on tour they had him play accordion on a few songs. When the Warped Tour ended Tim went back to college to finish his degree. A month after being back in school he got a call that the Dropkick mandolin player had left the band and they asked Tim to join full time. He joined the band full-time as the accordion/mandolin/tin whistle/banjo player. Brennan also played in the band Gimme Danger along with Marc Orrell, James Lynch, and Ben Karnavas. When Orrell left the Dropkick Murphys, Brennan became the band's lead guitarist, but also continued to play the accordion.  Tim continues to play the tin whistle on all Dropkick Murphys recordings despite having switched to lead guitar. Brennan also played drums in the band Double Nines with Dropkick Murphys' tech Kevin Rheault.

On September 10, 2014 Tim appeared on Ken Reid (comedian)'s TV Guidance Counselor Podcast. On February 17, 2017 Tim appeared on the Song Exploder podcast. On June 9, 2017 Tim appeared on the Mike Herrera Hour Podcast.

References

External links

Living people
American people of Irish descent
American male singers
American punk rock musicians
Singers from Massachusetts
Dropkick Murphys members
1983 births
Guitarists from Massachusetts
American mandolinists
American male guitarists
21st-century American singers